Baldoon Castle was a 16th-century castle about  south west of Wigtown, Dumfries and Galloway, Scotland, south of the river Bladnoch.

History
The Dunbars of Westfield owned the property for almost  three centuries from 1533-4.  It was a gift from King James V to Archibald Duncan.

Structure
Little remains of the castle: only a length of the south wall with the springing of at least three walls on its north face, and the remains of an entrance gateway lying  to the north. The gateway dates from the 17th century, and are described as a good example of Renaissance work.
The gate piers which were part of the entrance to the castle with bands of stylised rock-faced rustication  alternating with lozenges.  They are topped by cornices and moulded scroll caps.

The gate piers are registered as a Category A Listed Building.

Tradition
It is said that the ghost of Janet Dalrymple of Carscreugh haunts the ruin, in a bloodied wedding dress.  Janet was forced to marry Sir David Dunbar of Carscreugh Castle although she had fallen in love with another man, the impoverished Archibald 3rd Lord Rutherfurd. She either was murdered on her wedding night or died insane shortly afterward.

The story is the basis for both Sir Walter Scott’s The Bride of Lammermoor and Gaetano Donizetti’s opera Lucia di Lammermoor.

References

Castles in Dumfries and Galloway
Category A listed buildings in Dumfries and Galloway